The 1933 Paris–Tours was the 28th edition of the Paris–Tours cycle race and was held on 30 April 1933. The race started in Paris and finished in Tours. The race was won by Jules Merviel.

General classification

References

1933 in French sport
1933
April 1933 sports events